Daddy's Boy: A Son's Shocking Account of Life with a Famous Father is a 1989 book written by American author Chris Elliott and published by the Dell Publishing in the United States.

Plot
The book is a parody celebrity memoir, fictionalizing the author's childhood experiences as the son of comedian Bob Elliott. The chapters alternate between father and son, with Chris telling his story of growing up with a famous father in one chapter and Bob rebutting it in the next.

References

1989 American novels
Parody novels
Books by Chris Elliott